Alin Babei (born 13 December 1997) is a Romanian professional footballer who plays as a midfielder for Olimpic Cetate Râșnov. In the past Babei played for Sepsi OSK in the Liga III, after promotion of the team he was loaned at KSE Târgu Secuiesc, team with which he obtained another promotion, from Liga IV to Liga III, then being one of the most important players in the third league with 11 goals scored.

Honours
Sepsi OSK
Liga III: 2015–16

KSE Târgu Secuiesc
Liga IV – Covasna County: 2016–17

CSM Reșița
Liga III: 2018–19

References

External links
 
 Alin Babei at lpf.ro

1997 births
Living people
Sportspeople from Brașov
Romanian footballers
Association football forwards
Liga I players
Sepsi OSK Sfântu Gheorghe players
FC Dunărea Călărași players
CSM Reșița players